Mohan Ramchandra Patil (born 20 January 1968) is an Indian wrestler. He competed in the men's Greco-Roman 62 kg at the 1992 Summer Olympics.

References

External links
 

1968 births
Living people
Indian male sport wrestlers
Olympic wrestlers of India
Wrestlers at the 1992 Summer Olympics
Place of birth missing (living people)
Wrestlers at the 1990 Asian Games
Wrestlers at the 1994 Asian Games
Asian Games competitors for India